In demonology, Phenex is a Goetic demon. A Great Marquis of Hell he has twenty legions of demons under his command. He teaches all wonderful sciences, is an excellent poet, and is very obedient to the conjuror. Phenex hopes to return to Heaven after 1,200 years

Description
He is depicted as a phoenix, which sings sweet notes with the voice of a child, but the conjurer must warn his companions (for he is not to be alone) not to hear them and ask him to put on a human shape, which the demon supposedly does after a certain amount of time.

In conjuring
The 17th-century spellbook, The Lesser Key of Solomon describes this spirit as follows:
 
Phoenix is a great marquesse, appearing like the bird Phoenix, having a child's voice: but before he standeth still before the conjuror, he singeth many sweet notes. Then the exorcist with his companions must beware he give no ear to the melody, but must by and by bid him put on humane shape; then will he speak marvelously of all wonderful sciences. He is an excellent poet, and obedient, he hopeth to return to the seventh throne after a thousand two hundredth years, and governeth twenty legions.

Other spellings: Pheynix, Phoenix, Phoeniex.

See also

 Phoenix
 The Lesser Key of Solomon

Sources
S. L. MacGregor Mathers, A. Crowley, The Goetia: The Lesser Key of Solomon the King (1904). 1995 reprint: .

Goetic demons
Phoenix birds